The Uniform Parental Rights, Enforcement and Protection Act (UPREPA) was developed in September 2000, as a petition to the United States, and to several of the individual states. It is founded upon the equal protection clause of the 14th Amendment of the United States Constitution. The purpose of the reform was to guarantee that a child's rights to equal contact with each parent were protected by Federal law. The UPREPA would eliminate the concepts of custody and visitation.

This is a model legislation proposal, similar to the model legislation that has been proposed for tort reform, contract law, and criminal law. The act has been proposed to each of the fifty states of the United States of America, along with federal oversight requirements similar to that proposed, passed, and enacted under the UCCJA - Uniform Child Custody Jurisdiction Act.

References

External links 
 UPREPA

Divorce law in the United States
Fathers' rights